Good Timing is the third full-length album released by B1A4 under WM Entertainment. The album was released on November 28, 2016, by WM Entertainment and distributed by LOEN Entertainment. The first single, "A Lie (거짓말이야)", was produced by Jinyoung along with 9 other songs on the album. CNU also composed 3 songs.

B1A4 made their comeback in approximately fifteen months since they last released their EP Sweet Girl, and nearly three years since their last studio album Who Am I.

Release and promotion
On November 17, 2016, B1A4 has confirmed its comeback date to be November 28. On November 20, B1A4's Official Twitter account
revealed  individual teasers for each of the members. A few days later, the group dropped the album preview.

Track listing

Charts

References 

B1A4 albums
2016 albums
Kakao M albums